The Little Book may refer to:

 The Little Book (Hughes novel), a novel by English writer David Hughes
 The Little Book (Edwards novel), a novel by American writer Selden Edwards
 The Elements of Style by Strunk and White

See also